Mesa Arch (also known as Rotary Arch and Trail Arch) is a pothole arch on the eastern edge of the Island in the Sky mesa in Canyonlands National Park in northern San Juan County, Utah, United States. Mesa Arch is a spectacular natural stone arch perched at the edge of a cliff with vast views of canyons, Monster Tower, Washer Woman Arch, Airport Tower, and the La Sal Mountains in the distance. Access is via a relatively easy hiking trail, just a half-mile long from the park road.

Climate
Spring and fall are the most favorable seasons to visit Mesa Arch. According to the Köppen climate classification system, it is located in a cold semi-arid climate zone, which is defined by the coldest month having an average mean temperature below −0 °C (32 °F) and at least 50% of the total annual precipitation being received during the spring and summer.

References

External links

 MesaArch Trail: National Park Service

Natural arches of Utah
Canyonlands National Park
Natural arches of Grand County, Utah